Invasion of the Channel Islands may refer to:

 German invasion of the Channel Islands, 1940 during World War II
 Invasion of Jersey (disambiguation), any of several invasions of the island of Jersey